In biology, a spore is a unit of sexual or asexual reproduction that may be adapted for dispersal and for survival, often for extended periods of time, in unfavourable conditions. Spores form part of the life cycles of many plants, algae, fungi and protozoa. 

Bacterial spores are not part of a sexual cycle, but are resistant structures used for survival under unfavourable conditions. Myxozoan spores release amoeboid infectious germs ("amoebulae") into their hosts for parasitic infection, but also reproduce within the hosts through the pairing of two nuclei within the plasmodium, which develops from the amoebula.

In plants, spores are usually haploid and unicellular and are produced by meiosis in the sporangium of a diploid sporophyte. Under favourable conditions the spore can develop into a new organism using mitotic division, producing a multicellular gametophyte, which eventually goes on to produce gametes. Two gametes fuse to form a zygote which develops into a new sporophyte. This cycle is known as alternation of generations.

The spores of seed plants are produced internally, and the megaspores (formed within the ovules) and the microspores are involved in the formation of more complex structures that form the dispersal units, the seeds and pollen grains.

Definition
The term spore derives from the ancient Greek word σπορά spora, meaning "seed, sowing", related to σπόρος , "sowing", and σπείρειν , "to sow".

In common parlance, the difference between a "spore" and a "gamete" is that a spore will germinate and develop into a sporeling, while a gamete needs to combine with another gamete to form a zygote before developing further.

The main difference between spores and seeds as dispersal units is that spores are unicellular, the first cell of a gametophyte, while seeds contain within them a developing embryo (the multicellular sporophyte of the next generation), produced by the fusion of the male gamete of the pollen tube with the female gamete formed by the megagametophyte within the ovule. Spores germinate to give rise to haploid gametophytes, while seeds germinate to give rise to diploid sporophytes.

Classification of spore-producing organisms

Plants
Vascular plant spores are always haploid. Vascular plants are either homosporous (or isosporous) or heterosporous. Plants that are homosporous produce spores of the same size and type.

Heterosporous plants, such as seed plants, spikemosses, quillworts, and ferns of the order Salviniales produce spores of two different sizes: the larger spore (megaspore) in effect functioning as a "female" spore and the smaller (microspore) functioning as a "male". Such plants typically give rise to the two kind of spores from within separate sporangia, either a megasporangium that produces megaspores or a microsporangium that produces microspores. In flowering plants, these sporangia occur within the carpel and anthers, respectively.

Fungi
Fungi commonly produce spores during sexual and asexual reproduction. Spores are usually haploid and grow into mature haploid individuals through mitotic division of cells (Urediniospores and Teliospores among rusts are dikaryotic). Dikaryotic cells result from the fusion of two haploid gamete cells. Among sporogenic dikaryotic cells, karyogamy (the fusion of the two haploid nuclei) occurs to produce a diploid cell. Diploid cells undergo meiosis to produce haploid spores.

Classification of spores
Spores can be classified in several ways:

By spore-producing structure

Fungi
In fungi and fungus-like organisms (e.g. Pseudofungi), spores are often classified by the structure in which meiosis and spore production occurs. Since fungi are often classified according to their spore-producing structures, these spores are often characteristic of a particular taxon of the fungi.
 Sporangiospores: spores produced by a sporangium in many fungi such as zygomycetes.
 Zygospores: spores produced by a zygosporangium, characteristic of zygomycetes.
 Ascospores: spores produced by an ascus, characteristic of ascomycetes.
 Basidiospores: spores produced by a basidium, characteristic of basidiomycetes.
 Aeciospores: spores produced by an aecium in some fungi such as rusts or smuts.
 Urediniospores: spores produced by a uredinium in some fungi such as rusts or smuts.
 Teliospores: spores produced by a telium in some fungi such as rusts or smuts.
 Oospores: spores produced by an oogonium, characteristic of oomycetes.

Red algae
 Carpospores: spores produced by a carposporophyte, characteristic of red algae.
 Tetraspores: spores produced by a tetrasporophyte, characteristic of red algae.

By function
 Chlamydospores: thick-walled resting spores of fungi produced to survive unfavorable conditions.
 Parasitic fungal spores may be classified into internal spores, which germinate within the host, and external spores, also called environmental spores, released by the host to infest other hosts.

By origin during life cycle
 Meiospores: spores produced by meiosis; they are thus haploid, and give rise to a haploid daughter cell(s) or a haploid individual. Examples are the precursor cells of gametophytes of seed plants found in flowers (angiosperms) or cones (gymnosperms), and the zoospores produced from meiosis in the sporophytes of algae such as Ulva.
 Microspores: meiospores that give rise to a male gametophyte, (pollen in seed plants).
 Megaspores (or macrospores): meiospores that give rise to a female gametophyte, (in seed plants the gametophyte forms within the ovule).
 Mitospores (or conidia, conidiospores): spores produced by mitosis; they are characteristic of Ascomycetes. Fungi in which only mitospores are found are called "mitosporic fungi" or "anamorphic fungi", and are previously classified under the taxon Deuteromycota (See Teleomorph, anamorph and holomorph).

By mobility
Spores can be differentiated by whether they can move or not.
 Zoospores: mobile spores that move by means of one or more flagella, and can be found in some algae and fungi.
 Aplanospores: immobile spores that may nevertheless potentially grow flagella.
 Autospores: immobile spores that cannot develop flagella.
 Ballistospores: spores that are forcibly discharged or ejected from the fungal fruiting body as the result of an internal force, such as buildup of pressure. Most basidiospores are also ballistospores, and another notable example is spores of the genus Pilobolus.
 Statismospores: spores that are discharged from the fungal fruiting body as the result of an external force, such as raindrops or a passing animal. Examples are puffballs.

External anatomy

Under high magnification, spores often have complex patterns or ornamentation on their exterior surfaces. A specialized terminology has been developed to describe features of such patterns. Some markings represent apertures, places where the tough outer coat of the spore can be penetrated when germination occurs. Spores can be categorized based on the position and number of these markings and apertures. Alete spores show no lines. In monolete spores, there is a single narrow line (laesura) on the spore. This indicates the mother spore split into four along a vertical axis. In trilete spores, each spore shows three narrow lines radiating from a center pole. This shows that four spores shared a common origin and were initially in contact with each other forming a tetrahedron. A wider aperture in the shape of a groove may be termed a colpus. The number of colpi distinguishes major groups of plants. Eudicots have tricolpate spores (i.e. spores with three colpi).

Spore tetrads and trilete spores

Envelope-enclosed spore tetrads are taken as the earliest evidence of plant life on land, dating from the mid-Ordovician (early Llanvirn, ~), a period from which no macrofossils have yet been recovered.
Individual trilete spores resembling those of modern cryptogamic plants first appeared in the fossil record at the end of the Ordovician period.

Dispersal

In fungi, both asexual and sexual spores or sporangiospores of many fungal species are actively dispersed by forcible ejection from their reproductive structures. This ejection ensures exit of the spores from the reproductive structures as well as travelling through the air over long distances. Many fungi thereby possess specialized mechanical and physiological mechanisms as well as spore-surface structures, such as hydrophobins, for spore ejection. These mechanisms include, for example, forcible discharge of ascospores enabled by the structure of the ascus and accumulation of osmolytes in the fluids of the ascus that lead to explosive discharge of the ascospores into the air.

The forcible discharge of single spores termed ballistospores involves formation of a small drop of water (Buller's drop), which upon contact with the spore leads to its projectile release with an initial acceleration of more than 10,000 g. Other fungi rely on alternative mechanisms for spore release, such as external mechanical forces, exemplified by puffballs. Attracting insects, such as flies, to fruiting structures, by virtue of their having lively colours and a putrid odour, for dispersal of fungal spores is yet another strategy, most prominently used by the stinkhorns.

In Common Smoothcap moss (Atrichum undulatum), the vibration of sporophyte has been shown to be an important mechanism for spore release.

In the case of spore-shedding vascular plants such as ferns, wind distribution of very light spores provides great capacity for dispersal. Also, spores are less subject to animal predation than seeds because they contain almost no food reserve; however they are more subject to fungal and bacterial predation. Their chief advantage is that, of all forms of progeny, spores require the least energy and materials to produce.

In the spikemoss Selaginella lepidophylla, dispersal is achieved in part by an unusual type of diaspore, a tumbleweed.

Gallery

See also

 Aeroplankton
 Alternation of generations
 Auxiliary cell
 Bioaerosol
 Cryptospores
 Endospore
 Evolutionary history of plants
 Fern
 Sporophyte

References

Fungal morphology and anatomy
Germ cells
Plant reproduction 
Reproduction
Articles containing video clips